Abdulhafiz Bueraheng (born 17 October 1995), simply known as Awae, is a Thai professional footballer who plays as a left back or left winger for Thai League 1 club Nakhon Ratchasima.

Club career

Buriram United
May 2016, Abdulhafiz Bueraheng moved from Nara United in Regional League Division 2 to Buriram United in the second leg of 2016 season.

References

External links
 Profile at SPSTH
 

1995 births
Living people
Abdulhafiz Bueraheng
Association football defenders
Abdulhafiz Bueraheng
Abdulhafiz Bueraheng
Abdulhafiz Bueraheng
Abdulhafiz Bueraheng